Cape Breton Nova is a former provincial electoral district in Nova Scotia, Canada which existed between 1956 and 2013.  It elected one member to the Nova Scotia House of Assembly. In its last configuration, the district included the northern parts of Sydney including Whitney Pier, as well as a small area of Cape Breton County, all within the Cape Breton Regional Municipality.

The district was created in 1956. In 1993, it gained the Ashby area between Welton Street and Ashby Road from Cape Breton South and the Grand Lake Road area from Cape Breton West. It lost the Scotchtown and River Ryan/Lingan areas to Cape Breton Centre. In 2003, it lost the New Victoria area and gained part of northern Sydney. In 2013, Cape Breton Nova was absorbed by Cape Breton Centre, Sydney River-Mira-Louisbourg, and Sydney-Whitney Pier.

Members of the Legislative Assembly
The electoral district was represented by the following Members of the Legislative Assembly:

Election results

1956 general election

1960 general election

1963 general election

1967 general election

1970 general election

1974 general election

1978 general election

1981 general election

1984 general election

1988 general election

1993 general election

1998 general election

1999 general election

2003 general election

2006 general election

2009 general election

References

External links
 riding profile
 June 13, 2006 Nova Scotia Provincial General Election Poll By Poll Results

Former provincial electoral districts of Nova Scotia
Politics of the Cape Breton Regional Municipality